The Medellín Revolution (also known as Colombia Revolution) is a women's ultimate team based in Medellín, Colombia which competes professionally in the Premier Ultimate League (PUL) and as a club team in national and international competitions. The team has represented Colombia on the international stage numerous times. As a team, they are known for a unique free-spirited attitude and a fast-paced, relentless style of play; they are considered one of the top club teams in the world. Plays by several of their players have been selected for the ESPN SportsCenter Top 10 highlights show.

The Revolution club was co-founded by coach Mauricio Moore and Andrea Trujillo in 2004 in response to the lack of playing opportunities for women to play ultimate in Colombia. The Revolution have won 11 consecutive club women's championships in Colombia, beginning in 2009.

The Revolution joined the PUL for the league's inaugural 2019 season as the only competing team not based in the United States. The team went undefeated and won the 2019 PUL championship.

As a PUL team 
The Revolution is one of the original eight teams in the Premier Ultimate League. They participated in a 2018 series of showcase games among several teams who would go on to become founding members of the PUL.

The team would have played its second season in 2020, but the PUL cancelled the season due to the COVID-19 pandemic.

Record 
Considered a clear front-runner for the 2019 regular season, the Revolution lived up to pre-season expectations and defeated the Atlanta Soul 30–20 in the first ever pro women's ultimate game in Colombia and again 24–17 in Atlanta, the Raleigh Radiance 16–13, the Columbus Pride 18–16, and the Indianapolis Red 16–6.  This record gave them a first-place finish in the league prior to playoffs. Again a heavy favorite in the playoffs, the Revolution defeated the Atlanta Soul 27–26 in a double overtime semifinal game before besting the Raleigh Radiance 20–14 in the championship game.

Current coaching staff 
Mauricio Moore coaches Revolution in both the PUL and in club competition.

Roster
The team's roster differs somewhat between club and professional competition. The team's 2020 PUL roster was as follows:

As a club team 
The Revolution have competed as a club team since 2004 and have won 11 consecutive Colombian national championships beginning in 2009.

They have also been highly successful in international club competition, winning major tournaments like the US Open (2017) and consistently placing highly against top US and international competition.

They placed second at the 2018 World Ultimate Club Championships and seventh at the 2014 World Ultimate Club Championships. Colombian national women's teams, which have been coached by Revolution coach Mauricio Moore since at least 2017, are often populated largely by Revolution players and have likewise been successful in recent years.

The team has a close relationship with Denver Molly Brown, with several members of each team playing for the other in various club and professional competitions.

References

External links 
Official website: https://revolutionultimate.com/

Premier Ultimate League teams
Ultimate (sport) teams
Ultimate teams established in 2004
2004 establishments in Colombia